Saint Jack is a 1979 film directed by Peter Bogdanovich based on the 1973 novel Saint Jack. Ben Gazzara stars as Flowers in the film. The film also features Denholm Elliott and George Lazenby.

Plot
Jack, a likeable, freewheeling American pimp in Singapore, goes to the airport to pick up a British accountant for his Chinese 'boss', whom he only associates with to cover his real business, pimping, from the authorities.
He takes William, an uptight and nervy English accountant, to his hotel, then to a bar where British expats mingle. He meets a john, who he takes to a brothel, together with William, who only really wants a game of squash.
Returning, they are chased by Chinese triads, who resent Jack. The next day they find one of Jack's Chinese friends has been murdered, as a warning. As the plot unfolds, Jack is revealed to be a man of moral fibre and good character, who is struggling to plot the course of his life in Singapore, where his expat buddies are invariably drunk and disorderly. The arrival of William, a man of simple tastes who longs to get back home to a quiet retirement in the English countryside, brings about an epiphany for Jack, who is faced with a moral dilemma when asked to help blackmail a prominent US senator.

Cast

Film adaptation rights
Cybill Shepherd sued Playboy magazine after they published photos of her from The Last Picture Show. As part of the settlement, she got the rights to the novel Saint Jack, which she had wanted to make into a film ever since Orson Welles gave her a copy.

Production
Saint Jack was shot entirely on location in various places in Singapore in May and June 1978. Places featured in the film include the former Empress Place hawker centre (now demolished) and Bugis Street. The local authorities knew about the book, hence the foreign production crew did not tell them that they were adapting it, fearing that they would not be permitted to shoot the film. Instead, they created a fake synopsis for a film called Jack of Hearts, (what the director called "a cross between Love Is a Many Splendored Thing and Pal Joey") and most of the Singaporeans involved in the production believed this was what they were making.

Release
The film was banned in Singapore and Malaysia on January 17, 1980. Singapore banned it "largely due to concerns that there would be excessive edits required to the scenes of nudity and some coarse language before it could be shown to a general audience", and lifted the ban only in March 2006. It is now an M18-rated film.

Saint Jack was re-released in North America on DVD in 2001.

In an interview with The New York Times on 15 March 2006, Bogdanovich said "Saint Jack and They All Laughed were two of my best films but never received the kind of distribution they should have."

Critical reception
Roger Ebert gave the film a four-star review. In praise of Gazzara's performance, he writes "sometimes a character in a movie inhabits his world so freely, so easily, that he creates it for us as well. Ben Gazzara does that in Saint Jack." He goes on to say "The film is by Peter Bogdanovich and what a revelation it is, coming after three expensive flops. But here everything is right again. Everything." Stanley Kauffmann of The New Republic described Saint Jack as 'otiose and odious'.

References

External links 
 
 

1979 films
1979 drama films
1979 LGBT-related films
American LGBT-related films
American drama films
1970s English-language films
Films about prostitution
Films based on American novels
Films directed by Peter Bogdanovich
Films set in Singapore
Films shot in Singapore
New World Pictures films
Films with screenplays by Peter Bogdanovich
Works about prostitution in Singapore
1970s American films